Kauai Community College is a public community college in Līhue, Hawaii and it is the only institution of higher learning on the island. It is part of the University of Hawaii system and is accredited by the Accrediting Commission for Community and Junior Colleges.

History
Kaua‘i Community College (Kaua‘i CC) was established in 1926 as a vocational school within the State of Hawai‘i Department of Education. In 1965, Kaua‘i CC became a comprehensive community college and was transferred to the University of Hawai‘i (UH) System as one of the seven colleges in the UH Community College System.

Academics
The college awards degrees and certificates in Associate in Arts (AA) in Liberal Arts; Associate in Science (AS); Associate in Applied Science (AAS); Associate in Technical Studies (ATS); Certificate of Achievement (CA); Certificate of Completion (CC); Certificate of Competence (CO); and Academic Subject Certificate (ASC).

In addition to degree and certificate programs, Kaua‘i CC also offers non-credit courses for businesses and lifelong learning through our Office of Continuing Education and advanced courses leading to Bachelors and Graduate degrees through our University Center. The college primarily serves residents from the islands of Kaua‘i and Ni`ihau, with a special commitment to Native Hawaiians.

These programs are accredited by: National Automotive Technician Education Foundation (NATEF), American Culinary Federation Education Foundation Accrediting Commission, Accreditation of Allied Health Education Programs (CAAHEP), and the Accreditation Commission of Education in Nursing (ACEN).

Campus art

Campus art includes:
 Ke Mau Nei Ke Ea O Kaua'i I Puhi Aina Malu, copper and bronze sculpture by Bumpei Akaji, 1977
 Spiritual Stones, ceramic sculpture by Randy Naoto Hokushin, 1980
 Celebrating the Arts, granite and bronze sculpture by Ken Shutt, 1999 
 Kauai Counterpoint, painted steel sculpture by Robert Alan Flynn, 1978  
 Under the Pacific, enamel on steel sculpture by Hon-Chew Hee, 1979

Kauai Community College Performing Arts Center
The Kauai Community College Performing Arts Center is a 560-seat venue and cultural exhibition center. It is available for rental by non-profit organizations that focus on culture and the arts. It maintains a schedule of events on its home page.

See also
Kaua‘i Educational Association for Science and Astronomy (KEASA)

References

External links
 Official website

Community colleges in Hawaii
University of Hawaiʻi
Schools in Kauai County, Hawaii
Education in Kauai County, Hawaii
Schools accredited by the Western Association of Schools and Colleges
Buildings and structures in Kauai County, Hawaii
Educational institutions established in 1965
1965 establishments in Hawaii